The 1930 Oklahoma Sooners football team represented the University of Oklahoma in the 1930 college football season. In their fourth year under head coach Adrian Lindsey, the Sooners compiled a 4–3–1 record (3–1–1 against conference opponents), finished in second place in the Big Six Conference, and outscored their opponents by a combined total of 119 to 71.

No Sooners received All-America honors in 1930, but two Sooners received all-conference honors: guard Hilary Lee and back Buster Mills.

Schedule

References

Oklahoma
Oklahoma Sooners football seasons
Oklahoma Sooners football